From Headquarters is a 1929 American part-talkie adventure drama film directed by Howard Bretherton and starring Monte Blue, Guinn "Big Boy" Williams, Gladys Brockwell, Lionel Belmore, and Henry B. Walthall. The film was released by Warner Bros. on April 27, 1929, in sound version and June 6, 1929, in silent version.

Cast
Monte Blue as Happy Smith
Guinn "Big Boy" Williams as Gunnery Sgt. Wilmer (as Guinn Williams)
Gladys Brockwell as Mary Dyer
Lionel Belmore as Señor Carroles
Henry B. Walthall as Buffalo Bill Ryan
Eddie Gribbon as Pvt. Murphy
Ethlyne Clair as Innocencia
Pat Hartigan as Spike Connelly
John Kelly as O'Farrell
Otto Lederer as Bugs McGuire
William Irving as Fritz
Pat Somerset as Hendricks
Joseph W. Girard as Major (as Joseph Girard)
Edmund Breese as Bit Part (uncredited)

Preservation
The film is now considered lost.

References

External links

1920s adventure drama films
American adventure drama films
1929 films
Transitional sound films
American black-and-white films
Lost American films
Warner Bros. films
1929 drama films
1920s American films